Scissurella jucunda is a species of minute sea snail, a marine gastropod mollusk or micromollusk in the family Scissurellidae, the little slit snails.

Description
The shell grows to a height of 1.2 mm.

Distribution
This species occurs in the Atlantic Ocean off St Helena and Ascension Island.

References

External links
 To Biodiversity Heritage Library (7 publications)
 To Encyclopedia of Life
 To USNM Invertebrate Zoology Mollusca Collection
 To World Register of Marine Species

Scissurellidae
Gastropods described in 1890